Vanamõisa is a village in Viljandi Parish, Viljandi County, Estonia. It has a population of 54 (as of 4 January 2010).

See also
Battle of St. Matthew's Day (1217)

References

Villages in Viljandi County